The Women's 400 Individual Medley (or "I.M.") swimming event at the 2009 SEA Games was held in December 2009.

The Games Record at the start of the event was 4:51.87, swum by Joscelin Yeo at the 1999 SEA Games (on August 13).

Results

Final

Preliminary heats

References

Swimming at the 2009 Southeast Asian Games
2009 in women's swimming